Needamangalam block is a revenue block in the Needamangalam taluk of Tiruvarur district, Tamil Nadu, India. It has a total of 44 panchayat villages.

References 

 

Revenue blocks of Tiruvarur district